St Mary's Old Church, St Mary's is a parish church in the Church of England located in Old Town on St Mary's, Isles of Scilly, Cornwall, United Kingdom.

History
The Anglican church of St Mary was built at Old Town, Isles of Scilly during the 12th century, perhaps around 1130. Re-building was carried out between 1660 and 1667 including the addition of the south aisle, and a west end gallery for soldiers from the Garrison. Further improvements were made in 1743 when the east end was rebuilt.

By the nineteenth century, it was derelict and under the orders of Augustus Smith, Lord Proprietor of the Islands, it was restored.

Churchyard
The churchyard of Old Town church serves as the principal cemetery for the island of St Mary's. Over the centuries countless members of the old Scilly families have been buried here, as have been the crews of numerous ships lost near the Isles. Also buried here is Ann Cargill (1760–1784), an 18th-century opera diva and celebrated beauty of her time. She died when her ship sank off the Western Rocks and was first buried on Rosevear, before eventually being interred at Old Town Church.

Harold Wilson, Lord Wilson of Rievaulx KG OBE FRS PC, who served as Prime Minister of the United Kingdom from 1964 to 1970 and again from 1974 to 1976, was buried in the churchyard in May 1995, as were the ashes of his wife, Mary, in 2018.

The churchyard has been enlarged and redesigned several times. Today it is divided into several sections with the oldest surrounding the church itself. During the 19th century, terraces were cut into the hillside to make room for more burials.

The churchyard contains the grave of MP Ray Gunter (1909–1977), Minister of Labour under Prime Minister Harold Wilson. The grave of Lieutenant Roy Graham (1924–2007), who led the 1967 naval diving expedition that discovered the wreck of Admiral Sir Cloudesley Shovell's flagship , can be found in one of the newer sections of the cemetery.

Parish structure
St Mary's Old Church is within the United Benefice of the Isles of Scilly parishes, comprising 
All Saints' Church, Bryher
St Agnes' Church, St Agnes
St Martin's Church, St Martin's
St Mary's Church, St Mary's
St Nicholas's Church, Tresco

Sources
 Nikolaus Pevsner (1970) Cornwall; 2nd ed. (The Buildings of England). Penguin; p. 209

References 

 

Church of England church buildings in the Isles of Scilly
Grade II* listed churches in Cornwall
Grade II* listed buildings in Cornwall
National Heritage List for England
Buildings and structures in Cornwall
St Mary's, Isles of Scilly